Pyotr Petrovich Stepanov (born 2 January 1959) is a Transnistrian politician and was the Prime Minister of Transnistria from 18 January 2012 until 10 July 2013.

Stepanov is the first ever Prime Minister of Transnisitra.
His nomination was put forward by newly appointed President Yevgeny Shevchuk.
The majority faction of the Renewal Party unanimously supported Stepanov's candidacy.

On 10 July 2013 Pyotr Stepanov retired and on the same day President Shevchuk proposed Deputy Prime Minister Tatiana Turanskaya as a prime ministerial candidate. After addressing several questions to Turanskaya on her vision of major goals of the new government and on changes in government's composition the Supreme Council voted for her candidacy. On 10 July Tatiana Turanskaya became second Prime Minister of Transnistria, she had been acting as prime minister since 20 June. Composition of the government remained mostly unchanged.

Cabinet

References

1959 births
Living people
Transnistrian politicians
Prime Ministers of Transnistria